Joseph Roberts (2 September 1900 – 9 March 1984) was an English professional footballer who played as an outside forward in the Football League for Watford, Queens Park Rangers, Halifax Town, Southport, Clapton Orient, Luton Town, Barrow and Cardiff City, in non-League football for Oswestry Town, York City, Dartford and Worcester City and was on the books of Millwall without making a league appearance.

References

1900 births
Sportspeople from Birkenhead
1984 deaths
English footballers
Association football forwards
Oswestry Town F.C. players
Watford F.C. players
Queens Park Rangers F.C. players
York City F.C. players
Halifax Town A.F.C. players
Southport F.C. players
Leyton Orient F.C. players
Luton Town F.C. players
Millwall F.C. players
Barrow A.F.C. players
Cardiff City F.C. players
Dartford F.C. players
Worcester City F.C. players
English Football League players
Midland Football League players